Jehan Le Saulx d'Espanney, born in the second half of the 16th century was a French playwright from Épaney (Calvados).

He wrote a unique tragedy, in three days according to him, L'Adamantine ou le Désespoir (Rouen, Raphaël du Petit-Val, 1608) : Darimant loves Bezemonde, herself loved by Selpion.

Incipit 

MANES DE RICHEMONT.

Je viens du clair sejour ou la tourbe des Anges
Benit son Createur d’un beau flus de louanges,
Je n’en faits que sortir en mon cœur soucieux
De voir encor un coup la surface des Cieux,
Ni de l’objet plus doux la grandeur infinie,

Bibliography 
 Boisard, Notices sur les Hommes du Calvados, Caen 1848.
 E. Frère, Manuel du bibliographe normand, Rouen, 1858.
 E. Gosselin, Le théâtre à Rouen avant Corneille, Rouen, 1869.

See also 
 French Renaissance literature
 

16th-century French dramatists and playwrights
Writers from Normandy
Year of birth missing
Year of death missing